is the sequel to Onna Tachiguishi-Retsuden consisting of six loosely connected short stories. It was released in Japanese theaters November 10, 2007 and on DVD on April 23, 2008.

Production
While the original Tachiguishi was directed by Mamoru Oshii, only two of the short stories will be directed by him in Shin Onna. The remaining four will be directed by Makoto Kamiya, Kenji Kamiyama, Takanori Tsujimoto, and Hiroaki Yuasa. More changes from the original include a change from Oshii's creation of Super-livemation to a mix between live action and CG. Also instead of focusing on male characters, Shin-Onna will feature mainly the female counterparts hence the title which roughly translates as The True-Female Amazing Lives of Fast Food Grifters. The English release will go under the name The Women of Fast Food. Shin Onna Tachiguishi Retsuden is part of the Kerberos Saga under the Tachiguishi Arc.

Short films

Assault Girl: Hinako The Kentucky 
Directed by Mamoru Oshii.

The Golden Fish Girl 
Directed by Mamoru Oshii.

Dandelion: Mabu of the Dining Hall 
Directed by Kenji Kamiyama.

Angel of the Songs 
Directed by Makoto Kamiya.

Two Guns 
Directed by Takanori Tsujimoto.

Whispers in the Grass: Kumi of the Frozen Strawberries 
Directed by Hiroaki Yuasa.

References

External links 
Official Website
Shin Onna revealed
Shin Onna premiere

Kerberos saga
2007 films
2000s Japanese-language films
Films scored by Kenji Kawai
Films directed by Mamoru Oshii
2000s Japanese films